The Dalsfjord Lighthouse Museum is a Norwegian museum founded in 1993. It is dedicated to documenting and presenting the social history of the people that built lighthouses, sector lights, markers, moorings, and ports along the Norwegian coastline.

The museum is located in Dravlaus in the municipality of Volda, and it is part of the Sunnmøre Museum Foundation. The museum was opened in a new location with a new exhibit on November 8, 2012.

Entrance Fees 
Adults: 60 NOK (5.34 USD)

Children: 40 NOK (3.56 USD)

Seniors: 50 NOK (4.45 USD)

Group price: 50 NOK (4.45 USD)

References

External links
 Dalsfjord Lighthouse Museum
Sunnmøre Museum Foundation

Navigation
Museums in Møre og Romsdal
Volda
Lighthouses in Møre og Romsdal